Wolves of Kultur is a 1918 adventure film serial directed by Joseph A. Golden. It was Charles Hutchison's first serial and though he was the second lead, the film made him a star. Originally 15 chapters, it survives today only in an edited 7 chapter version, cut to showcase Hutchison's stunt work. The story has a war preparedness theme as an unnamed foreign power threatens America's security.

Cast
 Leah Baird as Alice Grayson 
 Charles Hutchison as Bob Moore
 Sheldon Lewis
 Betty Howe as Helen Moore
 Mary Hull as Marie Zaremba
 Edmund D'Alby as Mario Zaremba
 Austin Webb as Henry Hartman
 William Cavanaugh
 Fredrick Arthur
 Karl Dane
 Edwin Denison

Chapter Titles
 The Torture Trap
 The Iron Chair
 Trapping the Traitors
 The Ride to Death
 Through the Flames
 Trails of Treachery
 The Leap of Despair
 In the Hands of the Hun
 The Precipice of Death
 When Woman Wars
 Betwixt Heaven and Earth
 The Tower of Tears
 The Hun's Hell Trap
 The Code of Hate
 The Reward of Patriotism

See also
 List of film serials
 List of film serials by studio

References

Sources
 Rainey, Buck, Serials and Series, a World Filmography, 1912–1956, 1999, McFarland & Co., Inc.

External links
 

1918 films
1918 adventure films
American silent serial films
American black-and-white films
American adventure films
Films directed by Joseph A. Golden
1910s American films
Silent adventure films
1910s English-language films